Louis VII may refer to:

 Louis VII of France "the Younger" (1120–1180)
 Louis VII, Duke of Bavaria "the Bearded" (1365–1447)
 Louis VII, Landgrave of Hesse-Darmstadt (1658–1678)
 Louis VII of Gramont, duc de Gramont (1689–1745)